Merita Ann Allison (born February 19, 1940) is an American politician. She is a former member of the South Carolina House of Representatives from the 36th District, serving from 2008 to 2022. She was defeated by Rob Harris in the Republican Primary in 2022. She also sat in the House from 1993 to 2002.

References

Living people
1940 births
Republican Party members of the South Carolina House of Representatives
Women state legislators in South Carolina
21st-century American politicians
21st-century American women politicians